Energy in the Middle East describes energy and electricity production, consumption and import in the Middle East. Energy policy of the Middle East will describe the politics of the Middle East related to energy more in detail.

Primary energy use

Energy export 

Energy export from the Middle East in 2010 was 12,228 TWh. The major exporters were Saudi Arabia 37.2%, Qatar 14.3% and Iran 12.9%.

Oil 
In 2009 the largest share of oil production was in the Middle East (24 million barrels daily, or 31 per cent of global production). According to Transparency International based on BP data regionally the largest share of proved oil reserves is in the Middle East (754 billion barrels, constituting 51 per cent of global reserves including oil sands and 57 per cent excluding them). According to BP of the world oil reserves were in Saudi Arabia 18%, Iran 9%, Iraq 8%, Kuwait 7% and UAE 7%.

In June 2015, Jim Hollis, CEO of NEOS, during “Oil and Gas: Governance and Integration” forum, stated that Lebanon’s potential offshore natural gas reserves are estimated at 25 trillion cubic feet, according to initial estimates carried out in the country's exclusive economic zone.

Natural gas 
Middle Eastern countries possess about 41 per cent of natural gas reserves. According to BP in 2009 of the proved gas reserves were in Iran 16% and Qatar 14%.

Business 
Major energy companies in the Middle East include Saudi Aramco, QatarEnergy, Kuwait Petroleum Corporation KPC and National Iranian Oil Company NIOC.

Arab Region 
The Arab region which includes Algeria, Bahrain, Egypt, Iraq, Jordan, Kuwait, Lebanon, Libya, Mauretania, Morocco, Oman, Palestine, Saudi Arabia, Qatar, Sudan, Syria, Tunisia, the United Arab Emirates, and Yemen, hold approximately 60% of the world's oil reserves, and 30% of the world's gas reserves. The Arab region is highly dependable on the energy sector because it is the basis of its recent development. The energy sector represents approximately 40% of the Arab region's GDP. However, due to rapid increase in population, industrial and agricultural development, electricity consumption has increased dramatically in the region. In fact, the region's electricity consumption growth rate was registered at 7.9% per year in 2010 while the region's cumulative GDP growth rate at 3.9% during the same year.

The Arab region is facing a huge influx of energy demand coming from rapidly growing energy intensive urban industrial cities. A significant portion of the energy demand is due to water desalination plants. The interrelationship of exerting energy to produce water and vice versa is a concept known as Energy-Water-Nexus. These rapidly growing cities are experiencing world's fastest rates of energy consumption per capita, which also means enormous amount of water consumption as well. If this demand was not mitigated, it will drastically decrease the exported energy from the Arab region because most of it will have to be used within the region to meet its own demand. Consequently, economic instability will arise due to enormous lost in revenue.

Climate change 
Several Middle Eastern countries are among the world's top carbon dioxide emitters per capita: World dirty top countries were in 2009 (tonnes/capita): 1) Gibraltar 152, 2) Virgin Islands U,S 114, 3) Qatar 80, 4) Netherlands Antilles 51, 5) Bahrain 43. 6) United Arab Emirates 40, 7) Trinidad and Tobago 39, Singapore 34 and Kuwait 32. All emissions from building and cement production are local but some people may argue that some United Arab Emirates produced fuels and/or goods are consumed abroad. One of the biggest sources of emissions in the Middle East is air conditioning, a virtual necessity in the region's often torrid climate. Per capita use of air conditioning in the Middle East is currently far lower than in the United States, but is expected to increase.

References

See also

 
M